Caicos Express Airways is a passenger airline based in the Turks and Caicos Islands. The airline began charter flights in 2007 followed by scheduled services in 2011 from its hub at Providenciales, Turks & Caicos, to multiple domestic destinations. 
In December 2014, Caicos Express Airways began offering international flights to Haiti.

Caribbean
Turks and Caicos
Grand Turk - JAGS McCartney International Airport - (Secondary hub)
North Caicos - North Caicos Airport
Providenciales - Providenciales International Airport - (Main hub)
Salt Cay - Salt Cay Airport
South Caicos - South Caicos Airport
Dominican Republic
Santiago - Cibao International Airport
Santo Domingo - Las Americas International Airport
Haiti
Cap-Haitien - Hugo Chávez International Airport

Fleet

Previously operated
The Caicos Express Airways retired fleet includes the following aircraft:
 Piper PA-23-250 Aztec

Accidents 
On July 17, 2021, a Caicos Express Airways Cessna 402C (VQ-TIN) charter flight from Providenciales to Ambergris Cay performed a gear-up belly landing at Ambergris Cay when the pilot failed to deploy the landing gear prior to landing. According to the AAIB accident investigation report, the pilot failed to lower the landing gear prior to landing, the landing gear warning horn was inoperative (and not tested before departure), and the pilot failed to follow checklists and established flight procedures.  No one was seriously injured in the incident.

References

External links 
 

Airlines of the Turks and Caicos Islands
Airlines established in 2011
2011 establishments in the Turks and Caicos Islands